Il sole buio, internationally released as The Dark Sun and Dark Sun, is a 1990 Italian thriller-drama film directed by Damiano Damiani.

Plot

Cast 
 Jo Champa: Lucia Isgrò
 Michael Paré: Ruggero Brickman 
 Phyllis Logan: Attorney Camilla Staffa 
 Erland Josephson: Attorney Belmonte 
 Luciano Catenacci: Commissioner Catena
 Leopoldo Trieste: Alfonso Isgrò 
 Mattia Sbragia: Journalist
 Tano Cimarosa: Agent 
 Tony Sperandeo: Spacciatore

See also   
 List of Italian films of 1990

References

External links

1990 films
Films directed by Damiano Damiani
Italian thriller drama films
1990s thriller drama films
Films scored by Riz Ortolani
1990 drama films
1990s Italian-language films
1990s Italian films